Raghuramaiah or Raghu Ramaiah is one of the Indian names:

 Kalyanam Raghuramaiah, also known as Eelapata Raghuramaiah, Telugu drama and film actor
 Kotha Raghuramaiah, Indian Parliamentarian